Boveri is the surname of several people:

 Giovanni Boveri (Boverius), (1568–1638), Italian jurist 
Theodor Boveri (1862–1915), German biologist, brother of Walter Boveri
Marcella Boveri (1863–1950), US biologist, wife of Theodor Boveri
Walter Boveri (1865–1924), Swiss industrialist, co-founder of the company Brown, Boveri & Cie, brother of Theodor Boveri
Margret Boveri (1900–1975), German journalist and publicist, daughter of Marcella O'Grady and Theodor Boveri